The 1908 St. Louis Browns season was a season in American baseball. It involved the Browns finishing 4th in the American League with a record of 83 wins and 69 losses.

Offseason 
 October 5, 1907: Ollie Pickering was traded by the Browns to the Washington Senators for Charlie Jones.

Regular season 
 In April 1908, the Browns played the St. Louis Cardinals in an exhibition game to raise money for former Cardinals owner Chris von der Ahe. The clubs raised $4,300.

Season standings

Record vs. opponents

Roster

Player stats

Batting

Starters by position 
Note: Pos = Position; G = Games played; AB = At bats; H = Hits; Avg. = Batting average; HR = Home runs; RBI = Runs batted in

Other batters 
Note: G = Games played; AB = At bats; H = Hits; Avg. = Batting average; HR = Home runs; RBI = Runs batted in

Pitching

Starting pitchers 
Note: G = Games pitched; IP = Innings pitched; W = Wins; L = Losses; ERA = Earned run average; SO = Strikeouts

Other pitchers 
Note: G = Games pitched; IP = Innings pitched; W = Wins; L = Losses; ERA = Earned run average; SO = Strikeouts

Relief pitchers 
Note: G = Games pitched; W = Wins; L = Losses; SV = Saves; ERA = Earned run average; SO = Strikeouts

Notes

References 
1908 St. Louis Browns team page at Baseball Reference
1908 St. Louis Browns season at baseball-almanac.com

St. Louis Browns seasons
Saint Louis Browns season
St Louis